Elisabeth Oestreich (10 June 1909 – 21 May 1994) was a German middle-distance runner. She competed in the women's 800 metres at the 1928 Summer Olympics.

References

External links
 

1909 births
1994 deaths
Athletes (track and field) at the 1928 Summer Olympics
German female middle-distance runners
Olympic athletes of Germany
Place of birth missing